Foot cavalry was an oxymoron coined by the media to describe the rapid movements of infantry troops serving under Confederate General Thomas Jonathan "Stonewall" Jackson during the American Civil War. Jackson's men marched on foot but they were able to cover long distances day after day to surprise the enemy.

Origin
Cavalry units during the Civil War practiced the so-called foot cavalry drills. The media started to apply the phrase foot cavalry to Jackson's men starting from 1862. This was after Jackson's successful Shenandoah Valley campaign, in which Jackson usually surprised his Union opponents by completing much faster operational maneuvers.

On July 26, 1862, The Evening Star published the following, 

On September 10, 1862, The National Republican wrote,

In action

It was said of Jackson's foot cavalry, they take not what they cannot reach. To achieve the reputation for amazing speeds of marching (30 miles a day), Stonewall Jackson used a combination of great audacity, excellent knowledge and shrewd use of the terrain, added to the ability to inspire his troops to great feats of marching and fighting. His men endured forced marches and he used an intimate knowledge of the passes and railroad tunnels along the Blue Ridge Mountains of Virginia to move between the Piedmont region and the Shenandoah Valley with unanticipated rapidity, confounding his opponents in the Union leadership.<ref>Jackson and his "Foot Cavalry in Hall, John Lesslie. Half-hours in southern history. Richmond: B. F. Johnson Publishing Co., 1907, pp. 253-261.</ref>

Because his opponents learned early in the War that they could not accurately predict his location, Jackson and his "foot cavalry" are considered by many historians to have been a major factor in leadership failures of U.S. President Abraham Lincoln and General George B. McClellan during the Peninsula Campaign. In fear of Jackson, Lincoln ordered extra troops held back from McClellan's expedition to protect Washington, D.C. McClellan, whose actions were later seen as overcautious, was unnerved by Jackson's sudden appearance in front of him at the beginning of the Seven Days Battles. In combination, these actions of Lincoln and McClellan contributed significantly to the failure of the main mission of the Peninsula Campaign, which was to capture the Confederate capital of Richmond in the summer of 1862. Richmond would not be captured until the last days of the war.

Recognition
On January 16, 1866 The Daily Phoenix'' (Columbia, S.C.) called the Jackson's foot cavalry "immortal."

Indeed, contemporaries marveled at what Jackson's foot cavalry was capable of,

Historian Robert K. Krick wrote,

In honor of Jackson and his "foot cavalry" there is a 100-mile trail run in Fort Valley, Va with a division called "Stonewall Jackson Foot Cavalry Division".

See also
 Blue Ridge Tunnel
 Rockfish Gap
 Swift Run Gap
 Thornton Gap

References

Further reading
 "Old Jack" and His Foot-cavalry: Or, A Virginian Boy's Progress to Renown. A Story of the War in the Old Dominion. New York: J. Bradburn, 1864
 John H. Worsham. One of Jackson's foot cavalry; his experience and what he saw during the war 1861-1865, including a history of "F company." Richmond, Va., 21st regiment Virginia infantry, Second brigade, Jackson's division, Second corps, A. N. Va. New York: The Neale Publishing Company, 1912

External links
 Jackson's "Foot Cavalry" at Old Mill, Strasburg, Va., June 1, 1862, by Mort Künstler

Confederate States Army
Stonewall Jackson